The Diocese of Biharamulo is a diocese in the Anglican Church of Tanzania: the current bishop is Yusuph Vithalis.

Notes

Anglican Church of Tanzania dioceses
Anglican bishops of Biharamulo
Kagera Region